Rizer is a surname. Notable people with the surname include:

Ken Rizer (born 1964), American politician
Maggie Rizer (born 1978), American model and activist

See also
Y. M. Rizer House, an Italianate and Second Empire style house